Charles Adam Karch (March 17, 1875 – November 6, 1932) was a U.S. Representative from Illinois.

Born on a farm in Englemann Township, St. Clair County, Illinois, the son of German immigrants. Karch attended the public schools. He graduated from Northern Illinois Normal University (now the Illinois State University), at Normal, Illinois, in 1894. He taught school from 1895 to 1900.

Karch graduated from the law department of Wesleyan College (now Illinois Wesleyan University), Bloomington, Illinois, in 1898. He was admitted to the bar in 1898 and commenced practice in Belleville, Illinois.
He served as secretary to Congressman Fred J. Kern from 1901 to 1903. He served in the Illinois House of Representatives from 1904 to 1906 and again from 1910 to 1914. He moved to East St. Louis in 1914 where he continued the practice of law. He served as United States Attorney for the eastern judicial district of Illinois 1914–1918.

Karch was elected as a Democrat to the Seventy-second Congress and served from March 4, 1931, until his death. He had been nominated for reelection to the Seventy-third Congress. He died in St. Louis, Missouri, on November 6, 1932, and was interred in Mount Hope Cemetery, Belleville, Illinois.

See also
 List of United States Congress members who died in office (1900–49)

References

1875 births
1932 deaths
American people of German descent
Democratic Party members of the Illinois House of Representatives
Illinois State University alumni
Illinois Wesleyan University alumni
Illinois lawyers
United States Attorneys
People from St. Clair County, Illinois
Democratic Party members of the United States House of Representatives from Illinois